Gonatista reticulata is a species of praying mantis from the Caribbean.  According to one entomologist's notes:

See also
List of mantis genera and species

References

Mantidae
Insects of the Caribbean
Insects described in 1815